Anarchias similis is a moray eel found in coral reefs in the Atlantic Ocean. It was first named by Lea in 1913, and is commonly known as the pygmy moray, but is not to be confused with the Pacific species of the same name, Gymnothorax robinsi. It ranges in color and patterning from dark brown all over to blotched.

References

similis
Fish of the Atlantic Ocean
Fish of the Dominican Republic
Fish of the Caribbean
Fish described in 1913